Shane Geraghty (born 12 August 1986 in Coventry, West Midlands) is an English rugby union player who plays for Stade Francais in the French Top 14. Geraghty normally plays at centre or at fly-half.

Early life
He attended Bablake School until 2002 and Colston's Collegiate School until 2004.

Career
Coventry-born and able to play at both fly-half and inside centre, he progressed through the London Irish development system and made his senior club debut while still a member of the Exiles Academy, aged 18 in October 2004.

Geraghty was capped by England at U21 and A-level, before making the first of his six Test appearances to date off the bench against France in the 2007 Six Nations. On his England debut against France he scored a penalty and a conversion.

After 95 appearances in 5 seasons for London Irish, Shane joined Northampton Saints in July 2009 and was man-of-the-match in the club's historic Heineken Cup win over Munster, as well as picking up an Anglo-Welsh Cup winner's medal following a dramatic final against Gloucester. Geraghty was subsequently selected for England's 2010 summer tour of Australia and New Zealand, featuring in all 3 of the midweek matches.

Having scored 216 points in just under 40 matches for the Saints, he moved across the Channel to join French club CA Brive for the 2011/2012 season and played a key role as the side reached the semi-finals of the Amlin Challenge Cup.

In April 2012, it was announced that Geraghty would be returning to former club London Irish for the 2012/2013 season having signed a new two-year deal.

Having played no part in London Irish's opening 6 games in the 2016/17 RFU Championship, Shane Geraghty was granted early release from his contract in order to join Bristol Rugby. He was released by Bristol at the end of the 2016–2017 season.

2017/18 season, Geraghty signed for Stade Francais in the French Top 14

Personal life

Shane is married to Elizabeth Geraghty, née Garnish, from Epsom, Surrey where they now reside.

References

External links
 London Irish profile
 England profile
  Bablake school news announcement
 Guinness Premiership profile
 Career Stats@Statbunker 

1986 births
Living people
England international rugby union players
English people of Irish descent
English rugby union players
Irish Exiles rugby union players
London Irish players
Northampton Saints players
People educated at Bablake School
People educated at Colston's School
Rugby union centres
Rugby union fly-halves
Rugby union players from Coventry